RallyPoint may refer to:
RallyPoint, a professional networking platform for the US military community
Rally Point (novel), a fantasy novel by David Sherman
"Rally Point", an online driving game created by Xform games